Ponta de Água is a subdivision of the city of Praia in the island of Santiago, Cape Verde. Its population was 8,682 at the 2010 census. It is situated 2 km north of the city centre. Adjacent neighbourhoods are Monteagarro to the north, Coqueiro/Castelão to the east, Lem Cachorro to the south, Vila Nova to the southwest and Safende to the west.

References

Subdivisions of Praia